Hassan Sadian (1924 – 18 June 2013) was an Iranian wrestler. He competed in the men's freestyle featherweight at the 1948 Summer Olympics.

References

External links
 

1924 births
2013 deaths
Iranian male sport wrestlers
Olympic wrestlers of Iran
Wrestlers at the 1948 Summer Olympics
Sportspeople from Tehran